The Seignelay River is a river of the Côte-Nord region of Quebec.

Location

The Seignelay River Rises to the south of Lac Vallard.
It flows through the unorganized territory of Rivière-Mouchalagane in Caniapiscau, Quebec.
Its course is almost due south.
It is one of the major inlets to the Manicouagan Reservoir, along with the Mouchalagane, Hart Jaune, Themines and Petite Riviere Manicouagan.
Previous names included Rivière Cawiwanipis, Rivière Kawikwanipinis, Rivière Mistinic and Rivière Mistinik.
As of November 2021 the Commission de toponymie du Québec had not determined the origin or meaning of the present name.

Hydrology

It is the outlet of Lac Mistinic.

Kankakee River

In December 1679 Réné-Robert Cavelier, later known as the Sieur de La Salle, found a river that rose not far from the south bend of St. Joseph River, a tributary of Lake Michigan and flowed southwest 
He named it the Fleuve Seignelay (Seignelay River) after Jean-Baptiste Colbert, Marquis de Seignelay, the French minister of the navy and colonies.
The river continued southwest to join the Des Plaines River and form the Illinois River, a tributary of the Mississippi River.
It thus provided an important section of the route from Quebec to the Mississippi and the Great Plains.
This "Seignelay River" was renamed Theakiki River before taking its present name of Kankakee River.

Notes

Sources

Rivers of Côte-Nord